Calgary School District No. 19 or the Calgary Board of Education (CBE) is the public school board in Calgary, Alberta, Canada. As a public system, the CBE is required to accept any students who meet age and residency requirements, regardless of religion. Calgary Board of Education (CBE) was founded in 1885 as the Calgary Protestant Public School District No. 19.

Size

The CBE is the largest school board in Alberta, and over twice the size of the other major school district board in Calgary, the Calgary Catholic School District (CCSD), which teaches mainly Catholic students.  The other two districts based in the city, both Francophone, are a fraction of the size of the CBE with only a handful of schools each.  In land area, the CBE is the smallest of the four Calgary districts, as its territory is limited to municipal limits of Calgary (although its area is only slightly smaller than that of the CCSD).  As the city limits have expanded, the CBE boundary has remained in sync.  All CBE land overlaps the other three districts.

The CBE operates 247 schools in grades K-12.  Total student enrollment is around 125,000 students. For context, that is larger than the entire population of Red Deer. The operating budget is $1.3 billion for the 2021/22 school year, which is unchanged from the 2015/16 fiscal year, despite the addition of 10,000 students in that period.

Governance

A group of seven elected trustees govern the CBE.  Each trustee represents two wards in the city.  They are elected every four years, in the regular municipal election.  In the election, Calgary voters can only vote for a trustee to one (not both) of the two main school boards. The last election was in October 2021. Trustee Laura Hack was elected Chair of the Board of Trustees by her fellow Trustees in October 2021. The public (CBE) and Catholic (CCSD) systems operate independently of each other, and are both under the direct authority of the provincial government of Alberta.

Board history 

Taxing powers were stripped from boards by the Government of Alberta back in the 1990s.

The CBE Board of Trustees was dismissed by the Government of Alberta in 1999, when Danielle Smith was the Chair of the Board of Trustees. It was dismissed after being deemed dysfunctional by the province. An election was held in 1999 to replace the Board.

Long-serving Trustee and Chair of the Board, Pat Cochrane declined to run in the 2013 municipal elections. Cochrane was first elected in 1999 and has devoted much effort and time to the causes of Public Education. Fellow trustee George Lane was defeated by a wide margin in Wards 6 & 7.

For several election cycles, among the many candidates running on a platform of strengthening the CBE, there have also been candidates running on a platform of taking down the CBE and weakening the public education system in order to increase government funding for private options (which include private schools and charter schools). Some of these candidates have run as individuals and some have run as part of a slate of candidates. In the 2017 election, two members of the Students Count slate were elected and one, Lisa Davis, resigned before her term was ended and co-founded a charter school shortly after that duplicates existing CBE offerings. In the 2021 election, the take-down-the-CBE slate was called "Take Back the CBE". None of the candidates running on a platform of weakening the CBE were elected in the 2021 election.

Special programs
The CBE operates a number of special programs, usually, but not always operated out of regular schools (with regular instruction).

The CBE operates an adult and continuing education program through Chinook Learning Services. It offers High School Upgrading, Continuing Education and adult English as a Second Language (ESL) programs.

The Louise Dean Centre is a school specifically designed for female students that become pregnant before completing high school.  It provides daycare for the children, flexible schedules for the students, and special counseling.

The CBE's Gifted and Talented Education (GATE) program assists qualified students with more advanced instruction.  GATE compacts and accelerates the typical curriculum.  It also provides extra experts and mentors.  Currently, nine CBE schools offer the GATE program.

In 2003, the CBE opened the board's only all-female school, Alice Jamieson Girls' Academy.  In the same year, over the board's objections, the Calgary Girls' School (CGS) public charter school was also opened; but as a charter school, CGS is run independently of the CBE.  Both schools teach grades 4-9, and are founded on the premise that girls learn differently from boys, and will under-perform for social reasons when in the presence of male peers.

In 2011, the CBE opened the board's first all-male alternative program, based in the Sir James Lougheed School. The program teaches grades K-5, and similar to the all-girls schools - the program is founded on the premise that boys learn differently from girls, and they may behave differently in order to meet "macho" expectations, and that they require a more active, hands-on teaching style.

French as the primary language of instruction
The board also operates a French immersion program in a limited number of schools.  The program is geared mainly for English-speaking families who wish their children to become fully fluent in French.  It offers early and late immersion programs.

Up until 2000, the CBE also provided French instruction (as the primary language of instruction) to children from French families (who didn't need or want immersion).   When the Greater Southern Francophone School Board was formed in 2000, the CBE relinquished its authority over such schools, and handed over (what was then known as) Ecole Queen's Park (its only such school at the time) to the Francophone board.

Schools

Senior high schools

In Alberta, a senior high school teaches grades 10-12.  However, some may not teach all three grades.  Also, some are combined with junior high schools, which teach grades 7-9.  The following is a list of senior high schools operated by the CBE as of 2005, taken from the CBE's complete list.  The board divides the city into five areas.

The CBE, in 2010, launched the CBE Chief Superintendent's Student Advisory Council - a group of high school students with student representation from each of the CBE's high school programs. They meet regularly with the CBE's Chief Superintendent, Christopher Usih, to discuss issues in the system and propose solutions.

See also
 List of Alberta school boards
 List of high schools in Alberta

Notes

References
 "CBE will lose only Francophone school" By Colette Derworiz, Joe Bachmier, Calgary Herald. Calgary, Alta.: May 4, 2000. pg. B.10

External links

 The official site of the Calgary Board of Education
 CBe-learn Online School 
 Chinook Learning Services

School districts in Alberta
Education in Calgary